The 2003 Dallas Burn season was the eighth season of the Major League Soccer team. It still stands as the worst season in franchise history. It was the only season where the team had the worst record in the entire league. The team's average attendance of 7,906 still stands as the lowest in franchise history. The season saw team management fire head coach Mike Jeffries in September. Colin Clarke took over as interim head coach for the rest of the season. The 2003 season was played at Dragon Stadium in Southlake, Texas, home of the Southlake Carroll high school football team, featuring black, purple, white and yellow field lines for 5 different sports, on artificial turf.  At the Cotton Bowl, the Dallas Burn were known throughout the western hemisphere for having the best pitch in soccer.  The inexplicable stadium move decimated the team and their fans.  Crowds dwindled below 1000 and the team finished the season with a -29 goal differential.

Final standings

y - Conference Champions, x - clinched playoff berth

Regular season

U.S. Open Cup

External links
 Season statistics

2003
Dallas Burn
Dallas Burn
Dallas Burn